The 1965 St. Louis Cardinals season was the team's 84th season in St. Louis, Missouri and its 74th season in the National League. The Cardinals went 80–81 during the season and finished seventh in the National League, 16½ games behind the eventual World Series champion Los Angeles Dodgers. It was also the last full season for the original Busch Stadium.

Offseason 
 October 15, 1964: Pedro Borbón was signed as an amateur free agent by the St. Louis Cardinals.
 November 30, 1964: Chris Krug was drafted from the Cardinals by the Chicago Cubs in the 1964 minor league draft.
 December 7, 1964: Gordie Richardson and Johnny Lewis were traded by the Cardinals to the New York Mets for Tracy Stallard.
 March 1, 1965: Willie Montañez was signed as an amateur free agent by the Cardinals.

Regular season 
The mid-1960s saw changes both on the field and off – all while retaining the core of a remarkable successful franchise and its renewed popularity in St. Louis. Schoendienst's replacement of Keane had been preceded a few weeks earlier by general manager Bing Devine's firing, the redemption of the final pennant drive having come too late to assuage owner August Busch's dwindling patience.  Devine was replaced by Bob Howsam, who made a number of moves to shore up a talented but aging team which struggled through the 1965 campaign, finishing mired in 7th place at 80–81.  A capable GM if not Devine's equal, Howsam made some moves that worked – and some that did not.  Howsam traded aging veterans Bill White, Dick Groat, and utility catcher Bob Uecker to Philadelphia in return for Pat Corrales, Art Mahaffey, and Alex Johnson.  Popular third baseman Ken Boyer was dispatched to the Mets in exchange for pitcher Al Jackson.  Finally, pitcher Ray Sadecki was traded to the Giants for first baseman Orlando Cepeda in 1966.  The latter moves worked better than the former, but the Cardinals still finished in 6th place in 1966, resulting in Howsam's replacement by none other than Cardinals legend Stan Musial.  Musial's most notable move was to acquire Yankees' star Roger Maris.

Pitcher Bob Gibson, first baseman Bill White, and outfielder Curt Flood won Gold Gloves this year.

Season standings

Record vs. opponents

Opening Day starters 
Ken Boyer
Lou Brock
Curt Flood
Dick Groat
Julián Javier
Bob Purkey
Dave Ricketts
Bob Skinner
Bill White

Notable transactions 
 June 8, 1965: Rich Hacker was drafted by the Cardinals in the 39th round of the 1965 Major League Baseball Draft, but did not sign.

Roster

Player stats

Batting

Starters by position 
Note: Pos = Position; G = Games played; AB = At bats; H = Hits; Avg. = Batting average; HR = Home runs; RBI = Runs batted in

Other batters 
Note: G = Games played; AB = At bats; H = Hits; Avg. = Batting average; HR = Home runs; RBI = Runs batted in

Pitching

Starting pitchers 
Note: G = Games pitched; IP = Innings pitched; W = Wins; L = Losses; ERA = Earned run average; SO = Strikeouts

Other pitchers 
Note: G = Games pitched; IP = Innings pitched; W = Wins; L = Losses; ERA = Earned run average; SO = Strikeouts

Relief pitchers 
Note: G = Games pitched; W = Wins; L = Losses; SV = Saves; ERA = Earned run average; SO = Strikeouts

Awards and honors

League leaders 
Lou Brock, National League leader, stolen bases, 63

Farm system 

LEAGUE CHAMPIONS: Rock Hill

References

External links
1965 St. Louis Cardinals at Baseball Reference
1965 St. Louis Cardinals team page at www.baseball-almanac.com

St. Louis Cardinals seasons
Saint Louis Cardinals season
St Louis